Castlewellan GAC (also known as St Malachy's GAC, or in Irish, CLG Naomh Maolmhoig Caisleán a' Mhuilinn) is a Gaelic Athletic Association Club in Castlewellan, County Down, Northern Ireland. The club promotes the Gaelic Games of Hurling, Football, Camogie and other cultural and social pursuits.

History
The club was founded in 1905 and recently celebrated its centenary year in 2005.

Achievements

Notable players
 Pat Rice Member of the Down Senior team and won an Ulster & All-Ireland medal in 1960 & 1961. He also won a Down Senior Championship medals in 1965. 
 Colm McAlarney was a member of the Down Senior team from the 1960s until the 1980s. McAlarney is the only player to have won Railway Cup winners' medals in each of three decades. Colm was center back on the Down minor team that lost the All-Ireland Minor Final in 1966. He played midfield for the All-Ireland winning Down senior team of 1968, who defeated Kerry in the final. He was awarded man of the match for his performance in the 1968 All-Ireland final. All Stars in 1975 & 1978. He also won two Down Senior Championship medals in 1979 & 1982. 
 Mickey McVeigh played for Down 1995-2007 2 Irish News Ulster All-     stars team of the decade 1994-2004 won Railway cups with ulster. He also won two Down Senior Championship medals in 1994 & 1995. 
 Martin Laverty captained the Down minors & U21 Teams. Member of the Down Senior team and won an Ulster & All-Ireland medal in 1991. He also won two Down Senior Championship medals in 1994 & 1995. 
 Kevan Owens Member of the Down Senior team and won an Ulster & All-Ireland medal in 1991. He also won two Down Senior Championship medals in 1994 & 1995. 
 Gerard Lych Member of the Down Senior team and won an Ulster & All-Ireland medal in 1991
 Ciaran McCabe Member of the Down Senior team and won an Ulster & All-Ireland medal in 1994. He also won two Down Senior Championship medals in 1994 & 1995. 
 Gergroy McCartan from Ballymartin but moved to Castlewellan won an All-Ireland in 1991 & 1994 & all-Star 1994 Irish News Ulster All-Stars 1996
 Kevin Duffin All Ireland Minor medal winner 2005. Irish News All Star 2015
 Daniel Morgan Club Down All Star 2015
 Aidan Burns played for Down 2012, 2013. Irish News and Club Down All Star winner 2015
 Michael Cunningham former Down Goalkeeper

See also
Down Senior Club Football Championship
List of Gaelic Athletic Association clubs
An Riocht
Bredagh GAC
Clonduff GAC
Kilcoo GAC
Liatroim Fontenoys GAC
Longstone GAC
John Mitchel GFC
Newry Bosco GFC
Warrenpoint GAA

External links
Official Castlewellan GAA Club website
Official An Riocht GAA Club website
Official Down County website

Gaelic games clubs in County Down
Gaelic football clubs in County Down
Hurling clubs in County Down